The Final Count was the fourth Bulldog Drummond novel. It was published in 1926 and written by H. C. McNeile under the pen name Sapper.

Premise
Bulldog Drummond's old enemy Carl Peterson obtains the secret of brilliant scientist Robin Gaunt's newly developed chemical weapon and plots to use it to commit a series of spectacular crimes.

References

Bibliography

External links
 

1926 British novels
British crime novels
English novels
Hodder & Stoughton books